Events from the year 1172 in Ireland.

Events

Second Synod of Cashel.
Meath is granted to Hugh de Lacy by Henry II of England.
Henry II of England leaves Ireland.
Supposed construction date of first Hook Lighthouse.

Births
Walter de Lacy (d.1241) Lord of Meath.

Deaths
Death of Breifne King, Tiernan O'Rourke.

References